Happy Valley is or has been the name of several places in Tennessee, including:

Happy Valley, Blount County, Tennessee, unincorporated community near the Great Smoky Mountains National Park, associated with ZIP code 37878
Happy Valley, Carter County, Tennessee, in Elizabethton and adjacent Carter County
Happy Valley, Oak Ridge, Tennessee, a Manhattan Project construction camp; no longer in existence

See also
 Happy Valley (disambiguation)